Thowadra Monastery is a cliffside Tibetan Buddhist monastery in the Tang Valley of Bumthang District, Bhutan.

History
The site was blessed by Padmasambhava, who came here to meditate during the 8th century. He is said to have left behind a wooden bird which he used to expel an evil king from the beyul "hidden land" of Khenpajong. The monastery itself was founded in 1238 by Lorepa (1187-1250), the lama of the Drukpa Lineage of the Kagyu school who established Choedrak Monastery.

The site was originally a hermitage, once sanctified by the presence of both Longchenpa and Dorje Lingpa. A Nyingma community was established later in the 18th century by Changchub Gyeltsen (Jigme Kundrel), a disciple of Dzogchen master Jigme Lingpa (1730-1798). A noted nun plagued with leprosy, Gelongma Pelmo, also meditated here.

Since the 18th century it has been occupied by followers of Jigme Lingpa, who was one of the most important tertöns of Tibet, and Jigme Kundrol of the Longchen Nyingthig tradition. Thowadra marks the entrance to Khenpajong east of Lhedam in north Bumthang and Lhuntse Districts.

Footnotes

References
 Dorje, Gyurme (1999). Tibet Handbook with Bhutan. Footprint Handbooks. Bath, England. . 
 Pommaret, Francoise. (2006) Bhutan: Himalayan Mountain Kingdom, Fifth Edition (Odyssey Illustrated Guides) (Paperback). . 

Buddhist monasteries in Bhutan
1238 establishments in Asia
Tibetan Buddhism in Bhutan